Morghun may refer to:
 Morghun, Firuzabad
 Morghun, Shiraz